Aktobe International Airport  is an airport in Kazakhstan located  south-west of Aktobe. It has a small terminal with five airliner parking spots. It has serviced the Ilyushin Il-86.

Airlines and destinations

Passenger

Cargo

References

External links

Airports built in the Soviet Union
Airports in Kazakhstan